SCEP may refer to:
 Communications, Energy and Paperworkers Union of Canada, Energy and Paperworkers Union of Canada.
 Simple Certificate Enrollment Protocol, Simple Certificate Enrollment Protocol.
 Sony Computer Entertainment Poland, Sony Computer Entertainment Poland
 Southern California Earthquake Center.
 Student Career Experience Program, the United States Office of Personnel Management's (OPMs) program to bring experienced students into new government careers.
 Microsoft System Center Endpoint Protection, Microsoft System Center Endpoint Protection for Forefront Antivirus Management